Born Too Late is the third studio album by American doom metal band Saint Vitus, released in 1986. It was the first Saint Vitus album featuring The Obsessed singer Scott "Wino" Weinrich. It is generally cited as their greatest effort.

All the songs from this album except "The War Starter" are featured on the band's compilation album Heavier Than Thou.

On April 11, 2009, "Dying Inside" was performed by the band with Phil Anselmo as a guest in New Orleans.

Track listing 
All songs written by Dave Chandler, except where noted.

Side one
 "Born Too Late" (music: Chandler; lyrics: Chandler; Scott Reagers) – 6:52
 "Clear Windowpane" – 3:14
 "Dying Inside" – 7:23

Side two
 "H.A.A.G. (Hell Ain't a Game)" (music: Chandler; lyrics: Robert Gonzales) – 5:02
 "The Lost Feeling" – 5:22
 "The War Starter" – 6:43

CD reissue bonus tracks 
In 1987, SST re-released Born Too Late on CD and included the Thirsty and Miserable EP tracks, which are as follows.

  "Thirsty and Miserable" (Dez Cadena, Rosa Medea, ROBO) – 3:51 (Black Flag cover)
 "Look Behind You" – 3:18
 "The End of the End" – 5:49

Personnel
Saint Vitus
 Scott "Wino" Weinrich – vocals
 Dave Chandler – guitar
 Mark Adams – bass
 Armando Acosta – drums

Production
Joe Carducci – producer
Michael Lardie, Jim Mancuso – engineers

References

Saint Vitus (band) albums
1986 albums
SST Records albums